Bishaul-Ungarovo (Bişawıl-Uñğar) is a rural locality (a village) in Savaleyevsky Selsoviet, Karmaskalinsky District, Bashkortostan, Russia. The population was 573 as of 2010. There are 11 streets.

Geography 
Bishaul-Ungarovo is located 19 km northeast of Karmaskaly (the district's administrative centre) by road. Savaleyevo is the nearest rural locality.

References 

Rural localities in Karmaskalinsky District